Thomas J. Terputac (January 11, 1927 - June 26, 2014) . He was a former judge of the Courts of Common Pleas in Washington County, Pennsylvania.

He attended University of Pittsburgh, graduating in 1953.  He became judge in 1979.  In June 2004, he was honored by the Pennsylvania Bar Association with their "50-year Member Award."  In 2007, he received the "Clarity Award" from the Pennsylvania Bar Association's Plain English Committee for "the use of clear writing by legal professionals," awarded in part for his authorship of a book on legal writing.

He took senior status at the age of 70, with his seat on the bench filled by Paul Pozonsky.  In 2007, he retired from the court after 28 years as a judge.

See also
City of Washington–Washington & Jefferson College relations

Bibliography

References

Judges of the Pennsylvania Courts of Common Pleas
People from Washington County, Pennsylvania
University of Pittsburgh alumni
2014 deaths
1927 births
20th-century American judges